The federal minister for foreign affairs is the head of the Federal Foreign Office and a member of the Cabinet of Germany. The current office holder is Annalena Baerbock. Since 1966, the foreign minister has often also simultaneously held the office of vice chancellor.

History of the office
The Foreign Office was established within the North German Confederation in 1870 and its head, first appointed in 1871, had the rank of Secretary of State. As the German constitution of 1871 installed the Chancellor as the sole responsible government minister and since the Chancellor generally also held the position of Foreign Minister of Prussia, the Secretary of State fulfilled a more subject role as an assistant to the Chancellor, acting largely to draft correspondence rather than to actually direct the formation of foreign policy. This was especially true during the chancellorships of Otto von Bismarck (1871–1890) and Bernhard von Bülow (1900–1909), both of whom had considerable prior experience with foreign affairs, while secretaries at other times wielded more influence over the foreign policy.

In 1919, the Weimar Republic elevated the head of the foreign office to the position of Foreign Minister responsible for his department. As governments were now formed by parties entering coalitions with each other, individual ministers also gained independence towards from the chancellor.

After a succession of short-lived ministers, Gustav Stresemann, leader of the small National-liberal German People's Party, held the office of Foreign Minister in successive cabinets from 1923 to his death in 1929. His long term gave stability to Germany's foreign policy and improved the minister's position towards the relatively weak and short-lived chancellors. Stresemann was awarded the 1926 Nobel Peace Prize for his work for reconciliation between Germany and France.

The foreign office remained relatively unaffected by the establishment of the Nazi regime in 1933, as minister Konstantin von Neurath, appointed in 1932, remained in office until 1938; however, the office was increasingly marginalised in actual policy-making and with the replacement of Neurath by Ribbentrop lost any independent standing.

After World War II, two separate German states emerged in 1949, the democratic Federal Republic of Germany in the West and the communist-ruled German Democratic Republic in the East.  While the Soviet Union ostensibly restored political sovereignty to its satellite and allowed for a Foreign Ministry of the GDR, West Germany's sovereignty was officially curtailed by the Western powers, especially in the field of foreign policy.  In 1951 the Foreign Office was reestablished in West Germany, but Chancellor Konrad Adenauer was required to hold the office of Foreign Minister until the Western powers restored sovereignty to West Germany in 1955. Then, Heinrich von Brentano di Tremezzo succeeded as foreign minister in 1955.  In 1990, the GDR ceased to exist as a separate state and its territory was reunited with West Germany.

From the 1966 Grand Coalition government of Kurt Georg Kiesinger onwards, the office has been held by a member of the smaller partner in coalitions. Therefore, the Foreign Minister also mostly holds the office of Vice Chancellor of Germany, although this has become less common in recent years - neither of the two most recent Foreign Ministers, Heiko Maas and Annalena Baerbock, have been Vice Chancellor, with the Vice Chancellorship being held by Finance Minister Olaf Scholz during Maas' tenure, and by Economy and Climate Minister Robert Habeck during Baerbock's.

List of officeholders

German Reich (1871–1945) 
 State Secretaries for Foreign Affairs (1871–1919)

 Ministers of Foreign Affairs (1919–1945)
Political Party:

German Democratic Republic (1949–1990) 
 Ministers of Foreign Affairs
Political Party:

Federal Republic of Germany (1949–present) 
 Ministers of Foreign Affairs, since 1951
Political Party:

References

External links
 auswärtiges-amt.de

Lists of government ministers of Germany

1871 establishments in Germany
Germany